Marcelo Demoliner and João Souza were the defending champions, but they decided not to play together. Demoliner played alongside Elias and Souza played alongside Sá.

Guido Pella and Diego Sebastián Schwartzman won the title, defeating Máximo González and Andrés Molteni in the final, 1-6, 6–3, [10-4].

Seeds

  Ariel Behar /  Horacio Zeballos (quarterfinals)
  Andre Sá /  João Souza (quarterfinals)
  Máximo González /  Andrés Molteni (final)
  Roberto Maytín /  Fernando Romboli (quarterfinals)

Draw

Draw

References
 Main Draw

Sao Paulo Challenger de Tenis - Doubles
Tennis tournaments in Brazil
Sao